Makarovka is a village (selo) in the Republic of Mordovia, Russia, located within the administrative borders of the Republic's capital Saransk. Famous Russian Orthodox elder and wonder worker Sampson Sievers was a parish priest in this village during Soviet time. Here is situated Monastery of John the Evangelist in Makarovka.

Rural localities in Mordovia
Saransk
Saransky Uyezd